Official Portraits is a book published by Berlin Press in 2004. 

In 2004, a team of Berlin Press contributors, led by David Brown sent an open letter fax to the embassies of all 191 member states of the United Nations General Assembly, requesting they provide an official portrait of their nation's Head of State. Most obliged, and Official Portraits is thus a gallery of the received entries. The portraits vary greatly in quality, photography style, and size, but Brown says there is no noticeable correlation between the quality of the portrait and any variable of the country that provided it. Some countries did not provide a suitable portrait (for example, merely emailing a low-resolution JPEG), these are included in a small index in the back of the book. 

In Brown's letter he specifically asks the embassies for pictures of their "effective head of state... who actually runs the country." In practice, a more formal term may be "head of government" and indeed, most of the portraits are of heads of government (Prime Ministers) and thus not heads of state per se. Some countries did not understand the request, apparently, and emailed portraits of figurehead or otherwise symbolic officials who cannot be said to "run the country" in any meaningful sense. These include:

St. Lucia - portrait submitted of Governor General Pearlette Louisy
Grenada - portrait submitted of Governor General Daniel Charles Williams
Greece - portrait submitted of President Kostis Stephanopoulos
Monaco - portrait submitted of Prince Rainier III 

It may also be interesting to political scientists to note the photographs submitted by countries whose exact office of heads of state or government are unclear:

North Korea - Kim Jong Il, described as "Chairman of the National Defense Commission"
Iran - President Mohammad Khatami (not Supreme Leader Ayatollah Khamenei)
Libya - Muammar Gaddafi, described as "Leader of the Great Al Fatah Revolution"

References

External links

Photographic collections and books